Fatback (also known as streak of lean or streak of fat) is a cut of meat from a domestic pig.  It consists of the layer of adipose tissue (subcutaneous fat) under the skin of the back, with or without the skin (pork rind). Fatback is "hard fat" and is distinct from the visceral fat that occurs in the abdominal cavity which is called "soft fat" and is used to produce leaf lard.

Like other types of pig fat, fatback may be rendered to make a high-quality lard. It is one source of salt pork.  Finely diced or coarsely ground fatback is an important ingredient in sausage making and in some meat dishes.

Fatback is an important element of traditional charcuterie. In several European cultures it is used to make specialty bacon.  Containing no skeletal muscle, this bacon is a delicacy.

At one time fatback was Italy's basic cooking fat, especially in regions where olive trees are sparse or absent, but health concerns have reduced its popularity. However, it provides a rich, authentic flavour for the classic battuto – sautéed vegetables, herbs and flavourings – that forms the basis of many traditional dishes. Today, pancetta is often used instead.

Bacon

Fatback is processed into slab bacon by many methods, including brine curing, dry curing, smoking, or boiling.  Usually the skin (rind) is left on.

This fatback bacon is widely eaten throughout Europe. In Italy it is called lardo, and notable examples are Valle d'Aosta Lard d'Arnad and Lardo di Colonnata.  In Ukraine, Russia, and other countries of the former Soviet Union, it is called salo.  In Hungary, where it is called szalonna and in Bulgaria and Romania, where it is called slanina, it is very popular for campfire cookouts (szalonnasütés).  In Germany, where it is called Rückenspeck (back pork fat), it is one of two cuts known as Speck.

Pork rinds

Fatback is a traditional part of southern US cuisine, soul food and the traditional cuisine of Quebec, where it is used for fried pork rinds (known there as cracklings, or oreilles de crisse in Quebec), and to flavor stewed vegetables such as leaf vegetables, green beans, and black-eyed peas.  A common delicacy is strips of heavily salted and fried fatback.  Fatback was extremely popular in the South during the Great Depression because it is an inexpensive piece of meat.  In the southwestern United States, fried fatback is known by its Spanish name, chicharrón.

In sausages
Fatback is an important ingredient in notable traditional sausages including nduja, cudighi, and cotechino Modena.

In cooking

In French cooking, very thinly sliced fatback is used to line the mold when making a terrine or pâté, and thin strips of fatback are inserted under the skin of lean gamebirds for roasting.  These techniques are barding and larding, respectively, and in both the fatback is used without the rind.  Fatback also is used to make lardons, salt pork, and lard.

In popular culture
The 1954 rhythm and blues song "Fat Back and Corn Liquor" was written by Louisiana songwriter Rudy Toombs and sung by Louis Jordan. It was released by Aladdin Records as the A side of a ten-inch 78rpm record.

See also

References

External links
 

Cuts of pork
Charcuterie
Soul food
African-American cuisine